Oliver Hindle (born 17 November 1988) is an English singer-songwriter and record producer from Leeds, England, best known for his solo project Superpowerless, and YouTube persona, Oliver Age 24. He occasionally releases music under the moniker Boots on Cats and was previously a member of the bands Tetrastar, Scared of Dinosaurs and Spacebars.Broken.

He has been recording, producing, releasing and performing since he was 16 years old. As Superpowerless, he produces music combining pop/rock songs with electronic sounds created using synthesizers, Virtual Studio Technology and circuit bent video game consoles such as Nintendo Game Boy, Commodore 64 and the Nintendo Entertainment System. Superpowerless is best known in chiptune and video game culture for playing chaotic live shows and for embracing a do it yourself ethic, self-producing his recordings and self-distributing them through online social networking channels.

All music by Superpowerless is composed, recorded, produced and mastered by Oliver Hindle. Separate from his studio work, is the Superpowerless Live Band who tour and perform in music videos and promotional material. The current official live members include Oliver Hindle, Circuit Ben and Callum Whittall. The list of previous members and temporary performers is extensive and often unplanned and spontaneous.

Accolades
Superpowerless was the hand selected winner of the 2009 MTV / Vodafone Fast Track competition, As part of the Fast Track prize, Superpowerless re-recorded his winning single "Wasted My Time" with Grammy-Nominated producer and DJ, Andy Chatterley (The Pussycat Dolls, Kanye West, Kylie Minogue, Diana Vickers, Nerina Pallot, Blondie), and an accompanying video with director Luc Janin (Stereophonics, The Fratellis, Boy Kill Boy and Lethal Bizzle).

The resulting music video for "Wasted My Time" was played in rotation on mtv in 29 countries. It also became a popular video on YouTube.

History
Oliver Hindle played in multiple bands around the Leeds area during his teen years before starting his solo career in 2006. His music gained momentum due to his success with web promotion and national press coverage in NME. Upon releasing several free promotional EPs and Albums for download, Superpowerless topped the Myspace UK Music Charts. After being commissioned to remix artists such as The Lonely Island, I Fight Dragons, Nerina Pallot, Wheatus and Detroit Social Club, Superpowerless quickly secured a place in the world of internet artists. In 2009 Superpowerless songs were featured on the web-based Guitar Hero clone JamLegend, accumulating over a million plays and topping the charts.

He is also known for his wide variety of cover songs and remixes including Daft Punk, Lady Gaga, Aqua, Radiohead, Timbaland/OneRepublic, Jonathon Coulton, Yellowcard, MGMT, Blink 182, Michael Jackson, InTheLittleWood and more.

Oliver co-founded the band Tetrastar with artist Jaylyn Coffin in 2010. They were undergoing production of their debut original LP, scheduled to release in early 2012. In December 2011 the band announced that the project was over.

Throughout 2012, Superpowerless performed on the Anime Convention circuit throughout England, joined on stage by Callum Whittall, Circuit Ben and members of Area 11.

Releases
Superpowerless released his first official single "We Throw Shapes" in May 2011. The accompanying video was entirely animated and produced by Oliver Hindle. The music video was animated using pixel art and became popular after featuring in many blogs and also published in IDN Magazine. The music video also features a cameo from live band member Jaylyn Coffin.

Following the death of Michael Jackson, Superpowerless released an 8-bit tribute EP called "Moonwalker".

The Superpowerless Debut LP, Monsters was released on 17 November 2011. It features 14 original songs and original artwork by Oliver Hindle. The album was entirely self-recorded and self-produced.

Britain's Got Talent
In 2012, Oliver was approached by producers of the show Britain's Got Talent in regards to Superpowerless performing in the competition. After assurance that they would be portrayed in a professional and positive light, Superpowerless was fast-tracked through the regular auditions and given a place in the televised semi-finals. On the day of the audition the band were wearing tin foil costumes and felt all interviews and questions were conducted in a manner intending to portray them in a negative light, reducing their act in to a novelty/comedy routine intended for ridicule and humiliation.

The story was published in newspapers, magazines and high-traffic websites/blogs. Britain's Got Talent made no public statements regarding the issue but the audition and interviews were never aired as part of the show.

Live performances/tours
The Superpowerless live band has toured the UK multiple times, playing over 300 shows.

References

External links

 Superpowerless on Last.fm

1988 births
Living people
Musicians from Leeds
English male singer-songwriters
21st-century English singers
21st-century British male singers